The Closers is the 15th novel by American crime author Michael Connelly, and the eleventh featuring the Los Angeles detective Hieronymus "Harry" Bosch. This novel features a return to an omniscient third-person style narration after the previous two, set during Bosch's retirement (Lost Light and The Narrows) were narrated in from a first-person perspective.

Major Characters
Harry Bosch: Harry Bosch is the lead detective in the story. Bosch returns to LAPD after a three-year retirement. He works in the open-unsolved (cold cases) division of the force. Bosch is an intelligent detective who leaves no stone unturned. He is the only member of his police academy class still working for the LAPD.

Kizmin Rider: Kizmin "Kiz" Rider is an African American detective with the Los Angeles Police Department. She initially worked robbery and fraud in the Pacific Division before moving to the homicide table in the Hollywood Division where she was assigned to Squad One along with Harry Bosch and Jerry Edgar. She had persuaded the chief to take Harry back to service.

References

References 

 Book was written by Michael Connelly, the famous American author of crime fictional novels.
 A Study Guide for Michael Connelly's "The Closers".

2004 American novels
Harry Bosch series
Novels set in Los Angeles
Little, Brown and Company books